The fourth season of the American television drama series Better Call Saul premiered on August 6, 2018, and concluded on October 8, 2018. The fourth season consists of 10 episodes and aired on Mondays at 9:00 pm (Eastern) in the United States on AMC. A spin-off prequel of Breaking Bad, Better Call Saul was created by Vince Gilligan and Peter Gould, both of whom also worked on Breaking Bad.

The first and second seasons mainly took place in 2002, with season three advancing the storyline to 2003. The fourth season also takes place mainly in 2003, with the last four episodes taking place in 2004 after a time jump in the seventh episode. In season four, Jimmy and Kim struggle to cope with Chuck's death. Howard believes that he is responsible for Chuck's death, and suffers with depression and disengagement from work. Mike begins security inspections at Madrigal, disregarding the fact that his consulting contract was supposed to be only a paper transaction. Gus is suspicious of Nacho after Hector's stroke. Nacho becomes a mole for Gus inside the Salamanca organization. Gus hires an engineer and construction crew to begin construction of the meth "superlab" under the industrial laundry. Lalo Salamanca arrives to begin running the family's drug business.

The fourth season of Better Call Saul received acclaim from critics and audiences, particularly for its pacing and character development, and six nominations for the 71st Primetime Emmy Awards, including Outstanding Drama Series.

Production
AMC renewed Better Call Saul for a 10-episode fourth season in June 2017. The fourth season premiered in August 2018, and aired on Mondays at 9:00pm (Eastern); the fourth season premiered later in the year than previous seasons, as both season 1 and 2 premiered in February 2015 and 2016, and season 3 premiered in April 2017. Screen Rant speculated that because the season was not confirmed until after the third season had finished airing, that the writers had a later start at writing, and the season did not begin filming until January 2018.

Filming
Better Call Saul is set and filmed in Albuquerque, New Mexico, the same location as its predecessor. Filming for the fourth season of Better Call Saul began in January 2018. The first episode was directed by Minkie Spiro. On May 30, 2018, screenwriter Thomas Schnauz confirmed in a tweet that production of the fourth season had finished.

In the first scene of the season, Jimmy is hiding his real identity under his Gene Takavic alias while working at a Cinnabon in a shopping mall in Omaha, Nebraska. The Cinnabon scenes in Better Call Saul are set in Omaha, but filmed at the Cottonwood Mall in Albuquerque, New Mexico.

Mark Margolis, who plays drug kingpin Hector Salamanca, required brain surgery after suffering severe head injuries in an accidental fall during filming.

The episode "Piñata" was directed by Andrew Stanton, who is better known for writing and directing several Pixar films, including Finding Nemo and WALL-E. During a conversation with Mark Johnson and Melissa Bernstein, the show's executive producers, he was given the suggestion that he accept an opportunity to direct a Better Call Saul episode, which he jumped at, as he had already been a fan of both Breaking Bad and Better Call Saul, and wanted the opportunity to work with the creators Vince Gilligan and Peter Gould.

Casting

Returning main cast members are Bob Odenkirk as Jimmy McGill, Jonathan Banks as Mike Ehrmantraut, Rhea Seehorn as Kim Wexler, Patrick Fabian as Howard Hamlin, Michael Mando as Nacho Varga, and Giancarlo Esposito as Gus Fring. Michael McKean (Chuck McGill), who was credited as a main cast member in previous seasons, does not return as a series regular following Chuck's death in the third season finale. In a June 2017 interview following the third-season finale, McKean commented on the possibility of returning to the series, stating "I know they want to bring me in for some flashbacks this coming season." McKean made a guest appearance in a flashback sequence at the beginning of the sixth episode, "Piñata", and again in the season finale, "Winner".

In May 2018, it was reported that Stefan Kapičić would have a recurring role in the fourth season. Kapičić stated, "I'm thrilled that I have a chance to become a part of Better Call Saul family. It is one of my favorite shows on TV and it's a dream come true be a part of the Breaking Bad universe." Lalo Salamanca, portrayed by Tony Dalton, is introduced in the eighth episode of the season. The character was first mentioned in the Breaking Bad episode "Better Call Saul".

The episode "Something Beautiful" marks the first Better Call Saul appearance of Gale Boetticher, a supporting character from Breaking Bad played by David Costabile. Costabile had been in Albuquerque filming Dig while Better Call Sauls team was wrapping up production of the first season. He met with Gould, and they agreed to have Gale appear on Better Call Saul. Costabile was able to work in filming for Better Call Saul between filming on Billions, but had only about a week to memorize both his dialogue and the lyrics to Tom Lehrer's "The Elements" which he had to sing karaoke-style in his scenes.  This short period contrasted with his past singing performances on Breaking Bad, when he had more time to learn the lyrics.

Plot
The death of Jimmy's brother Chuck serves as a catalyst for his further transformation into Saul Goodman, and Jimmy's entrance into the criminal world puts a strain on his relationship with Kim and his future as a lawyer. Chuck's death also deeply affects Kim and Howard. Mike becomes a contracted security consultant for Madrigal. Nacho's attempted murder of Hector Salamanca causes Hector's stroke and disability, and affects the operations of Don Eladio's drug cartel and Gus Fring's plot to take it over.

Gilligan said in January 2018 that Better Call Saul "gets darker this season," and Odenkirk said that the fourth season would go to "another level."

Cast and characters

Main
 Bob Odenkirk as Jimmy McGill / Saul Goodman, suspended New Mexico attorney, turned cell phone sales manager, moonlighting in prepaid phone sales to criminals. In the present, he manages a Cinnabon store in Omaha under the alias Gene Takavic.
 Jonathan Banks as Mike Ehrmantraut, Madrigal corporate security consultant, gradually becoming a "fixer" for Gus Fring's criminal ambitions.
 Rhea Seehorn as Kim Wexler, now primarily a corporate banking lawyer with a moral passion for public defense cases, Jimmy's girlfriend and legal confidant.
 Patrick Fabian as Howard Hamlin, sole managing partner of the now flailing Hamlin, Hamlin & McGill, executor of Chuck's estate, suffering from insomnia and depression.
 Michael Mando as Nacho Varga, a lieutenant in Don Eladio's Mexican cartel, now overseeing daily operations in Albuquerque; torn between the vicious Salamanca enforcers and Gus Fring's ambitions for complete takeover and secession from Eladio, co-opted by Fring after trying to kill Hector Salamanca.
 Giancarlo Esposito as Gus Fring, a Chilean national, now Albuquerque cocaine distributor in Don Eladio's cartel, using his fried chicken chain, Los Pollos Hermanos, as a legitimate front.

Recurring
 Mark Margolis as Hector Salamanca, the patriarch of a brutal family of drug enforcers in Don Eladio's Mexican cartel, incapacitated via a stroke at the end of season three.
 Kerry Condon as Stacey Ehrmantraut, Mike's widowed daughter-in-law and the mother of Kaylee Ehrmantraut
 Jeremiah Bitsui as Victor, Gus' henchman.
 Vincent Fuentes as Arturo, a criminal associate of Nacho Varga and Hector Salamanca.
 Ann Cusack as Rebecca Bois, Chuck's ex-wife.
 Dennis Boutsikaris as Rich Schweikart, the attorney for Sandpiper Crossing in the class action lawsuit Jimmy develops.
 Andrew Friedman as Mr. Neff, manager of Neff Copiers.
 Poorna Jagannathan as Dr. Maureen Bruckner, Johns Hopkins stroke-recovery specialist, funded by Gus Fring's grant to oversee Hector's treatment.
 Daniel Moncada and Luis Moncada as Leonel and Marco Salamanca, Hector's nephews, Tuco's cousins, brutal hitmen for the Eladio cartel.
 Javier Grajeda as Juan Bolsa, Eladio cartel under boss
 Ray Campbell as Tyrus Kitt, a henchman on Gus Fring's payroll.
 Juan Carlos Cantu as Manuel Varga, Nacho's father, owner of an upholstery shop.
 Abigail Zoe Lewis as Kaylee Ehrmantraut, Mike's granddaughter.
 Rex Linn as Kevin Wachtell, the CEO of Mesa Verde Bank, now Kim's only client.
 Cara Pifko as Paige Novick, the senior counsel of Mesa Verde Bank and Trust.
 Franc Ross as Ira, a burglar with whom Jimmy conspires, and the owner of Vamonos Pest.
 Keiko Agena as Viola Goto, Kim's paralegal.
 Tommy Nelson as Rocco, the leader of the thugs who mug Jimmy at House of Dogs.
 Carlin James as Zane, a thug who mugs Jimmy.
 Cory Chapman as Jed, a thug who mugs Jimmy.
 Eileen Fogarty as Mrs. Nguyen, owner of a nail salon and Jimmy's landlord.
 David Costabile as Gale Boetticher, an idealistic college chemistry student on scholarship.
 Rainer Bock as Werner Ziegler, a German engineer hired by Gus to plan and oversee the construction of his underground meth "superlab"
 Stefan Kapičić as Casper, a member of Werner Ziegler's team for the construction of Gus's meth "superlab"
 Ben Bela Böhm as Kai, a member of Werner Ziegler's construction team, who Mike holds in contempt
 Lavell Crawford as Huell Babineaux, a professional pickpocket hired by Jimmy for security.
 Michael McKean as Chuck McGill, who appears in flashbacks, Jimmy's deceased elder brother and a founding partner of HHM. Chuck committed suicide at the end of the third season.
 Josh Fadem as Camera Guy, a UNM film student, helps Jimmy on various endeavors.
 Hayley Holmes as Drama Girl, UNM film student who helps Jimmy on various projects and schemes.
 Julian Bonfiglio as Sound Guy, UNM film student who helps Jimmy.
 Tony Dalton as Lalo Salamanca, acting head of the Salamanca family of drug dealers, part of Don Eladio's cartel.
 Ethan Phillips as Benedict Munsinger, a judge.

Guest stars
 Ed Begley Jr. as Clifford Main, founding partner of Davis & Main, Jimmy's former employer in the second season.
 Don Harvey as Jeff, a cab driver Gene encounters.
 Laura Fraser as Lydia Rodarte-Quayle, a Madrigal Electromotive executive and associate of Gus Fring.
 JB Blanc as Barry Goodman, Gus Fring's medical counsel.
 Joe DeRosa as Dr. Caldera, a veterinarian who serves as Mike and Jimmy's liaison to the criminal underworld.
 Tamara Tunie as Anita, a member of Mike's widower's support group.
 Tina Parker as Francesca Liddy, Jimmy's receptionist.
 Peter Diseth as Bill Oakley, a deputy district attorney.
 Max Arciniega as Krazy-8 Molina, a cocaine distributor working for Nacho and the Salamanca family.
 Brandon K. Hampton as Ernesto, Chuck's paralegal/assistant, appears in a flashback.

Episodes

Reception

Critical response

The fourth season, much like the previous three, received critical acclaim, particularly for its pacing and character development. On Metacritic, the season has a score of 87 out of 100 based on 16 critics. On Rotten Tomatoes, the season has a 99% approval rating with an average score of 8.9 out of 10 based on 185 reviews. The site's critical consensus states, "Well-crafted and compelling as ever, Better Call Saul deftly balances the show it was and the one it will inevitably become."

Based on the first three episodes, Liz Shannon Miller of IndieWire gave the series a highly positive review with an "A" grade. She wrote that season four is "better, deeper, and more daring" and that it is "one of the most subtle and brilliant shows on TV." Spencer Kornhaber of The Atlantic said of the season premiere: "Old dynamics flip, long-gestating character studies pay off, and feelings geyser up in surprising places." Following the season finale, Judy Berman of Time wrote, "In showing us one individual's preordained moral downfall, Better Call Saul spent Season 4 demonstrating how a hypocritical criminal justice system can ensnare a whole class of people for life". Chris Evangelista of /Film wrote after the finale: "Better Call Saul remains one of the best shows on TV right now. Not only did Jimmy change this season, he changed those around him – and for the worst."

Lalo Salamanca, portrayed by Tony Dalton, is introduced as a recurring character in this season, Alan Sepinwall of Rolling Stone said  Dalton "makes a solid first impression in the role, so hopefully this will turn out to be more than filling in a blank most viewers had long since forgotten existed."

Critics' top ten list

Ratings

Accolades

In 2018, Better Call Saul was named one of the top 10 television programs of the year by the American Film Institute. The series won the award for Outstanding Achievement in Drama at the 35th TCA Awards.

For the 71st Primetime Emmy Awards, the series received six nominations–for Outstanding Drama Series, Odenkirk for Outstanding Lead Actor in a Drama Series, Banks and Esposito each for Outstanding Supporting Actor in a Drama Series, McKean for Outstanding Guest Actor in a Drama Series, and Schnauz and Gould for Outstanding Writing for a Drama Series for the episode "Winner".

Home media 
The fourth season was released on Blu-ray and DVD in region 1 on May 7, 2019. The set contains all 10 episodes, plus audio commentaries for every episode and several behind-the-scenes featurettes.

International broadcast
Outside the U.S. in certain international markets, season 4 was released on Netflix with episodes available the day after the episodes were broadcast on AMC.

Related media

Madrigal Electromotive Security Training
Similar to the series of fictional employee training videos used during season three, AMC posted  ten mini-episodes of Madrigal Electromotive Security Training to YouTube and its social media accounts during the run of season four. The videos feature a mix of live-action footage of Banks portraying Mike in providing training to new security employees of Madrigal and animated segments. The series had been nominated for the Primetime Emmy Award for Outstanding Short Form Comedy or Drama Series, but the nomination was pulled by the Academy of Television Arts & Sciences after they discovered the episodes were too short for the category, stating "This decision is in no way a diminishment of the quality of Better Call Saul Employee Training or Mr. Banks' performance in it".

References

External links
  – official site
 
 

2018 American television seasons
Season 4
Television series set in 2003
Television series set in 2004